The subfamily Phaoniinae is within the Diptera family Muscidae. All species are in the tribe Phaoniini.

References

Muscidae
Diptera of Europe
Diptera of North America
Taxa named by John Russell Malloch